Toroq or Tarq may refer to:
 Tarq, Isfahan
 Toroq, Kashmar, Razavi Khorasan Province
 Toroq, Mashhad, Razavi Khorasan Province